Monument is a city in Grant County, Oregon, United States. The population was 128 at the 2010 census. It is located near the confluence of the North and Middle Forks of the John Day River. Its post office was established in 1874 and named for a nearby mountain or rock formation.

As of 2000, the Monument School District, consisting of the Monument School, had a  science building for its environmental sciences curriculum, which was paid for by a federal grant of about a $500,000. The program taught students about the ecology of local Ponderosa Pine forest and sagebrush steppe and the water quality and habitat of streams. The school had over 100 students in 1997, but the decline of ranching and timber production caused many families to move, bringing the number of children at the school down to 62 by the year 2000. Annual federal timber payments to the city of Monument declined from $100,000 in 1990 to $5,000 in 2000. With a population of 165 in 2000, Monument had "a grocery store, restaurant, tavern, three churches, a senior center, fire station and the offices of the Columbia Power Electric Cooperative utility."

Geography

Climate
This region experiences warm (but not hot) and dry summers, with no average monthly temperatures above . According to the Köppen Climate Classification system, Monument has a steppe climate, abbreviated "BSk" on climate maps.

Demographics

2010 census
As of the census of 2010, there were 128 people, 55 households, and 31 families residing in the city. The racial makeup of the city was 94.5% White, 0.8% Native American, 3.9% from other races, and 0.8% from two or more races. Hispanic or Latino of any race were 3.9% of the population.
There were 55 households, of which 29.1% had children under the age of 18 living with them, 43.6% were married couples living together, 9.1% had a female householder with no husband present, 3.6% had a male householder with no wife present, and 43.6% were non-families. 38.2% of all households were made up of individuals, and 12.7% had someone living alone who was 65 years of age or older. The average household size was 2.33 and the average family size was 3.23.

The median age in the city was 40.5 years. 24.2% of residents were under the age of 18; 5.6% were between the ages of 18 and 24; 26.6% were from 25 to 44; 27.4% were from 45 to 64; and 16.4% were 65 years of age or older. The gender makeup of the city was 54.7% male and 45.3% female.

2000 census
As of the census of 2000, there were 151 people, 68 households, and 41 families residing in the city. The population density was 281.0 people per square mile (108.0/km). There were 81 housing units at an average density of 150.7 per square mile (57.9/km). The racial makeup of the city was 95.36% White, 3.97% Native American, and 0.66% from two or more races.

There were 68 households, out of which 26.5% had children under the age of 18 living with them, 47.1% were married couples living together, 7.4% had a female householder with no husband present, and 39.7% were non-families. 32.4% of all households were made up of individuals, and 11.8% had someone living alone who was 65 years of age or older. The average household size was 2.22 and the average family size was 2.78.

In the city, the population was spread out, with 25.2% under the age of 18, 7.3% from 18 to 24, 27.2% from 25 to 44, 23.8% from 45 to 64, and 16.6% who were 65 years of age or older. The median age was 35 years. For every 100 females, there were 118.8 males. For every 100 females age 18 and over, there were 113.2 males.

The median income for a household in the city was $24,000, and the median income for a family was $45,714. Males had a median income of $38,750 versus $21,250 for females. The per capita income for the city was $15,814. There were 6.8% of families and 17.1% of the population living below the poverty line, including 19.2% of under eighteens and 8.0% of those over 64.

Transportation
 Monument Municipal Airport

References

External links
 Grant County Chamber of Commerce entry for Monument
 Entry for Monument in the Oregon Blue Book

Cities in Oregon
Cities in Grant County, Oregon
1905 establishments in Oregon
Populated places established in 1905